Gabriella Remport Nagy is a Hungarian former ice dancer. With Sándor Nagy, she is a two-time Hungarian national champion. The duo competed at three World Championships and four European Championships. They were coached by Ilona Berecz.

Remport works as a skating coach and choreographer in Budapest. Her former students include Zsuzsanna Nagy / György Elek, Emese László / Máté Fejes, and Krisztina Barta / Ádám Tóth. She is based at Twiczle Korcsolyázó Egyesület.

Remport and Nagy married each other. They are the parents of Hungarian ice dancer Zsuzsanna Nagy (born 10 June 1986 in Budapest).

Competitive highlights 
With Sándor Nagy

References 

Hungarian female ice dancers
Hungarian figure skating coaches
Living people
Figure skaters from Budapest
Year of birth missing (living people)